156th Infantry Division was an infantry division of the French Army during the First World War. It was deployed overseas, seeing action during the Gallipoli campaign, and thereafter on the Salonika front, fighting alongside British troops in both theatres of war. It was sent to the Crimea in December 1918 as part of the Army of the Danube.

Creation and nomenclature 
 March 17, 1915 : Creation of the 156th Infantry Division
 29 April 1915 : Takes the name of 2nd Infantry Division of the Corps expéditionnaire d'Orient
 15 October 1915 : Reverts to the designation of 156th Infantry Division

Commanders 
 16 March 1915 : General Maurice Bailloud
 26 August 1916 – 1 May 1918 : General Baston
 11 June 1919 – 12 October 1919 : General Dufieux

Chronology

1915 
 2 May - 7 August 1915: until May 20, transport by sea to Cape Helles by the liner SS France (1910) (converted during wartime into a troopship). From 6 May, as its units landed, engaged in the Battle of Krithia: took part, on May 6th, 7th and 8th, 1915, in the 1st engagement of Kéréves Déré; 4, 21 and 30 June, fought in the 2nd, 3rd and 4th engagements of Kéréves Déré; 12 and 13 July, present in the 5th engagement of Kéréves Déré. From 13 July, preparations for the offensive.
 7 August - 1 October: fought in the 6th engagement of Kéréves Déré; then took up positions in the French sector.
 1 October - 9 December: evacuation of the Gallipoli peninsula; transported to Salonika. From 14 October, occupation, on the Serbian-Bulgarian border, of a sector northeast of Guevgheli (Gevgelija):
  21 October: seizure of Rabrovo; local actions 22 and 23 October.
  3 - 12 November: offensive towards Strumica; progression to Kosturino, thereafter fortification and the defence of the captured positions.
 9–16 December: retreat to Salonika:
  9th,  10th and 11th  December: defence of Boyimia, Fourka and Chernitsa positions.  Then retreat movement in two columns, towards Kilindir (Kalindria in the municipal unit of Cherso) and Karasouli (Polykastro).
 16 December 1915 - May 5, 1916: establishment of the entrenched camp of Salonika, between Kiorziné (Xirochori) and Dogandji (Prochoma). From 20 March, elements detached 15 kilometres north of Kiorziné (entrenching work, then, from April 18, occupation of the Kilindir front, Lake Ardzan).

1916 

 5 May - 29 July: established positions on the (Kalindria) Kilindir front, Lake Ardzan (by the entire division).
 July 29 - August 31: relief by British elements. Regrouping south of Bohemitsa (Axioupoli); preparations for an offensive (elements engaged towards Lioumnitsa (Skra, Kilkis)). From August 21, transported by the Kodza Déré Decauville Railway in the Veria region, Ostrovo.
 31 August 1916 – 2 January 1917: participation in the allied Monastir offensive : until August 31, grouping of the division south of Lake Ostrovo (fighting near Nalbandkeui). From September 12, offensive; on the 15th, crossing the Malka, towards Aitos (Aetos, Florina); the 17th occupation of Florina; then took up positions in a sector facing the Verbéni front (Itea, Florina), Arménohor (Armenochori, Greece).
 From 30 October, pursuit of the enemy to the Kenali (:sh:Kremenica (Bitolj)) lines and attacks.
 From 15 November, new enemy withdrawal up to 6 kilometres south of Monastir (Bitola), then 19 November to the north of the city. Established and defended positions in a sector, 3 kilometres north of Monastir (Battle of the River Cherna).

1917 

 2 January - 13 March: occupation of a new sector between the stream of Bratin Dol, Ternova and the ridge of Baba Planina. Elements of the division (176th Infantry) seconded to Albania.
 13 March 13–1 June: engaged in the Battle of Monastir (1917): attacks from enemy positions towards Péristéri and Tservéna Sténa; advance west of Ternova; on 26 March new attack towards Tservéna Sténa; then fortification of the captured positions:
 17 April: violent enemy attack in the direction of Dihovo.
 19 April: French counter-attack.
 1 June - 25 July 25: occupation of the Dihovo region, Lake Prespa.
 25 July 1917 – 7 January 1918: withdrawal from the front. Movement by successive elements towards the region of Negovani (Flampouro, Florina), Léskovéts (Leskoec). In September and October 1917, elements engaged in the operations of Pogradec.

1918 

 7 January - 27 August: occupation of a sector towards the Prespa and Okrida lakes (frequent local actions). Elements are detached towards Gorgopi, then to the Battle of Skra-di-Legen.
 27 August - 16 September: relieved from the front line; dispatched to rest area towards Monastir.
 16–29 September: occupation of a sector north of Monastir. From 21 September, the division's cavalry engaged in the :fr:Manœuvre d'Uskub: advance towards Pribilci, and, on 29 September, to the outskirts of Sop (3 km north west of Cer, Kičevo) and Tsersko (:sh:Golemo Cersko).
 29 September - 11 November: Bulgarian Armistice; withdrawal from the front line; redeployed for a rest towards Lopatitsa (Lopatica, Bitola), then towards Kičevo.

1919 
In December 1918, the 156th Division was transported to Southern Russia (as part of the Army of the Danube (AD) ). It then left this formation in November 1919 to form the Army of the Levant, during the Cilicia Campaign.

Order of battle

May 1915 

 

2nd Division which disembarked at Gallipoli from 6–8 May 1915
 3rd Metropolitan Brigade  
176th Regiment
three battalions of metropolitan infantry
2nd Provisional African Regiment
composed of three battalions of Zouaves
 4th Colonial Brigade  
7th Mixed Colonial Regiment
mixed composition of two battalions of Senegalese Tirailleurs, and one battalion of French regulars known as Marsouins. Both troop types classified as Troupes coloniales.
8th Mixed Colonial Regiment
mixed composition of two battalions of Marsouins and one battalion of Senegalese 
Divisional Troops
Groupe Deslions - 3 batteries (4x 75mm field guns apiece) of the 17th Field Artillery Regiment commanded by Captain Deslions
Groupe Mercadier - 3 batteries (4x 75mm field guns apiece) of the 25th Field Artillery Regiment commanded by Captain Mercadier (succeeded by Captain Salin) 
Groupe Roux - 3 batteries (4x 75mm field guns apiece) of the 47th Field Artillery Regiment commanded by Captain Roux (succeeded by Major Mercadier) 
Supporting elements for engineering, logistical and medical services

October 1915 
Left the Dardanelles and disembarked on the Salonika front in October 1915  to become part of the Armée d'Orient (1915–19). The Division's War Diary lists the following elements of the Division to be embarked locally and from further afield: 
 1st Metropolitan Brigade
175th Regiment
three battalions of metropolitan infantry
1st Provisional African Regiment
composed of a Foreign Legion battalion and two Zouave battalions.  Both troop types classified as Army of Africa (France)
 3rd Metropolitan Brigade
176th Regiment
three battalions of metropolitan infantry
2nd Provisional African Regiment
composed of three Zouave battalions
Divisional Troops
Groupe Deslions - 3 batteries (4x 75mm field guns apiece) of the 17th Field Artillery Regiment commanded by Captain Deslions 
Groupe Salin - 3 batteries (4x 75mm field guns apiece) of the 25th Field Artillery Regiment formerly commanded by Captain Mercadier (succeeded by Captain Salin) 
Groupe Grépinet - 2 batteries (4x 65 mm mountain guns apiece) of the 2nd Mountain Artillery Regiment formerly commanded by Major Benedittini (succeeded by Major Grépinet) 
6 58T trench mortars
Divisional Ammunition Column: Artillery park detachment, 12th Ordnance Section, half of a mobile repair workshop team. In transit from France: 1 infantry munitions section, 2 artillery munitions sections (S.M.I. - Section de Munitions d’Infanterie, S.M.A. - Section de Munitions d’Artillerie). 
Supporting elements for engineering, logistical and medical services
Engineers: 2x field companies (5/15 and 5/15bis); engineer park detachment 5/22
Telegraphy: Divisional RT detachment, P2 signal lamp detachment, 2 radio sets to be sent from France
Medical: Group of divisional stretcher-bearers, ambulances 3 and 4, casualty evacuation section, half-Group of Corps stretcher-bearers. In transit from France: 1 Field Hospital, 2 Casualty Clearing Stations
Lines of Communication: A detachment of Army Catering Corps (COA - Commis et ouvriers d’administration), a field bakery in transit, two logistics companies in transit from Algeria, two motor transport sections in transit from France, a labour battalion.
Corps Artillery:
1 Heavy Battery of 120 mm field artillery commanded by Captain Delval 
1 Heavy Battery of 6x 155 mm howitzers of the 48th Field Artillery Regiment commanded by Captain Kolyczko

July 1916 
 311th Brigade
175th Regiment
three battalions of metropolitan infantry
1st Provisional African Regiment
composed of a Foreign Legion battalion and two Zouave battalions. Both troop types classified as Army of Africa (France)
 312th Brigade
176th Regiment
three battalions of metropolitan infantry
2nd Provisional African Regiment (disbanded in September 1917)
composed of three Zouave battalions
Divisional Troops
Groupe Deslions - 3 batteries (4x 75mm field guns apiece) of the 17th Field Artillery Regiment commanded by Captain Deslions
Groupe Salin - 3 batteries (4x 75mm field guns apiece) of the 25th Field Artillery Regiment formerly commanded by Captain Mercadier (succeeded by Captain Salin)
Groupe Coloniale - 3 batteries (4x 75mm field guns apiece) of the 3rd Colonial Field Artillery Regiment, having arrived in January 1916. (There was nothing of significance to occur that warranted a mention in the regimental history.) All of the 75mm batteries above were grouped together in April 1917 to form the 242nd Field Artillery Regiment.
Groupe Grépinet - 2 batteries (4x 65 mm mountain guns apiece) of the 2nd Mountain Artillery Regiment formerly commanded by Major Benedittini (succeeded by Major Grépinet)
Mortar Battery - 102nd Battery of the 17th Field Artillery Regiment, equipped with the Mortier de 58 mm type 2, reclassified in July 1918 as the 5th Battery of the 179th Trench Artillery Regiment.
One cavalry squadron of the 4th Regiment of Chasseurs d'Afrique having arrived in February 1916 (disbanded November 1918).
Supporting elements for engineering, logistical and medical services

Notes and citations 
Notes

Citations

References 

 
 
 
 
 
 
 
 
 	
 
 
 
 
   

French Infantry divisions during World War I
Infantry divisions of France
Military units and formations established in 1915
Macedonian front
Gallipoli campaign
Allied intervention in the Russian Civil War